George McLain may refer to:

 George P. McLain (1847–1930), Civil War veteran and member of the Los Angeles City Council
 George H. McLain, United States Democratic politician from California